The Charlon was a French automobile manufactured in 1905 and 1906 in Argenteuil, Val-d'Oise.  The smallest was a belt-driven voiturette, with a 9 hp engine possibly built under licence from the rather obscure Mahout company. Three larger models were also advertised with 12 to 40 hp; four cylinder engines and these used chain drive.

References
 David Burgess Wise, The New Illustrated Encyclopedia of Automobiles.

Defunct motor vehicle manufacturers of France